German submarine U-378 was a Type VIIC U-boat of Nazi Germany's Kriegsmarine during World War II.

She carried out eight patrols before being sunk by US aircraft on 20 October 1943 in mid-Atlantic at position .

She was a member of 16 wolfpacks.

She sank one warship.

Design
German Type VIIC submarines were preceded by the shorter Type VIIB submarines. U-378 had a displacement of  when at the surface and  while submerged. She had two shafts and two  propellers.

U-378 was fitted with five  torpedo tubes (four fitted at the bow and one at the stern), fourteen torpedoes, one  SK C/35 naval gun, 220 rounds, and a  C/30 anti-aircraft gun. The boat had a complement of between forty-four and sixty.

Service history
The submarine was laid down on 3 May 1940 at the Howaldtswerke yard at Kiel as yard number 9, launched on 13 September 1941 and commissioned on 30 October under the command of Kapitänleutnant Alfred Hoschatt.

First patrol
The boat's first patrol was in two parts and commenced with her departure from Kiel on 11 March 1942. The second part began from the German island of Helgoland (sometimes spelt 'Heligoland'). She was attacked northeast of Norway's North Cape by the British destroyer . No damage was sustained.

Second to sixth patrols
U-378 continued to operate in northern waters such as the Barents, Greenland and Norwegian seas until April 1943 when her sphere of operations changed to the Atlantic Ocean.

Seventh patrol
This sortie saw the boat leave Trondheim on 12 April 1943, negotiate the gap separating Iceland and the Faroe Islands and sail as far eastward as Newfoundland and Labrador. She then re-crossed the Atlantic, docking at La Pallice in occupied France on 4 June. At 54 days, this was easily the submarine's longest patrol.

Eighth patrol and loss
U-378 sank the Polish destroyer  on 8 October 1943. Her commander, ten officers, 166 ratings and seven British crew members were lost.

On 13 October, the boat was the target of a FIDO homing torpedo that had been dropped from a Grumman TBF Avenger, but the weapon missed.

Forty-eight men died in the depth charge attack; there were no survivors.

Wolfpacks
U-378 took part in 16 wolfpacks, namely:
 Zieten (23 – 29 March 1942) 
 Eiswolf (29 – 31 March 1942) 
 Robbenschlag (7 – 14 April 1942) 
 Blutrausch (15 – 19 April 1942) 
 Strauchritter (29 April – 5 May 1942) 
 Trägertod (19 – 22 September 1942) 
 Boreas (19 November – 9 December 1942) 
 Eisbär (27 – 30 March 1943) 
 Meise (25 – 27 April 1943) 
 Star (27 April – 4 May 1943) 
 Fink (4 – 6 May 1943) 
 Naab (12 – 15 May 1943) 
 Donau 2 (15 – 19 May 1943) 
 Mosel (19 – 24 May 1943) 
 Leuthen (15 – 24 September 1943) 
 Rossbach (24 September – 9 October 1943)

Summary of raiding history

References

Notes

Citations

Bibliography

External links

German Type VIIC submarines
U-boats commissioned in 1941
U-boats sunk in 1943
U-boats sunk by US aircraft
U-boats sunk by depth charges
1941 ships
Ships built in Kiel
Ships lost with all hands
World War II submarines of Germany
World War II shipwrecks in the Atlantic Ocean
Maritime incidents in October 1943